Edson Airport  is located within the town of Edson, Alberta, Canada. It does not serve any passenger flights.

References

External links

Certified airports in Alberta
Edson, Alberta